Laugardalslaug ("pool of Laugardalur") is a public thermal baths and swimming pool complex located in the Laugardalur district of Iceland's capital Reykjavík. With an indoor Olympic-size swimming pool, a 50-metre-long outdoor swimming pool, a 400 m2 playing pool, 8 hot pots of various temperatures, and a 17 m2 steam bath, it is the largest conventional swimming pool complex in Iceland.
Receiving about 800,000 visitors in 2010, it is the most visited thermal baths in Iceland after the Blue Lagoon.

The baths are owned by the City of Reykjavík, and are operated by its Department of Sport and Leisure (ÍTR; .)

History
The complex was constructed at its current location in 1958–1968, designed by city architect Einar Sveinsson, and was expanded in 1981–1986 by architect Jes Einar Þorsteinsson, and again in 2002–2005.

The springs were visited by Uno von Troil, Archbishop of Uppsala, on his journey to Iceland in 1772. He measured the water temperature at 89.4 °C.

Pools

Photos

References

Links 

Swimming venues in Iceland
Swimming pools